Emmit McHenry (born July 12, 1943, in Forrest City, Arkansas), is an American entrepreneur and company builder.

Biography
He grew up in Tulsa, Oklahoma, attending Stewart Elementary School, Carver Middle School and Booker T. Washington High School. He received his B.S. in communications from the University of Denver in 1966. He enlisted in the United States Marine Corps, where he attained the rank of lieutenant. McHenry earned his M.S. degree in communications from Northwestern University in 1979.
He started as an IBM Systems Engineer and later served as Assistant Dean and Instructor at Northwestern University.

With Gary Desler, Ty Grigsby, and Ed Peters he founded his first full-time entrepreneurial venture: Network Solutions. 

His accolades include an Honorary Doctorate from Shaw University, the Marine Corps Sunset Parade Guest of Honor for his contributions to the Nations C4 Capacity, and the Chairman’s Award from the Historically Black Colleges and Universities Foundation.

He is currently CEO, in partnership with his son Kurt, of Archura, a telecommunications systems integrator, and chairman and CEO of Defense Manufacturing.

References

External links

Living people
1943 births
American technology chief executives
University of Denver alumni
Northwestern University School of Communication alumni